Todd William Kurtz (born 4 November 1992) is a speedway rider from Australia.

Career
Kurtz won the 2008 Australian Under-16 Championship and is twice the Australian Longtrack Champion.

He rode in the top tier of British Speedway, riding for various teams, including the Leicester Lions in the SGB Premiership 2018.

In 2019, he rode for Somerset Rebels and Sheffield Tigers in the British leagues.

Family
His brother Brady Kurtz is also a leading speedway rider.

References 

1992 births
Living people
Australian speedway riders
Leicester Lions riders
Sheffield Tigers riders
Somerset Rebels riders
People from Cowra
Sportsmen from New South Wales